Silas High School is a four-year public secondary school in Tacoma, Washington. It is one of five traditional high schools in the Tacoma Public Schools and is located at the intersection of Orchard Street and 11th Street. Silas' current principal is Bernadette Ray; assistant principals are Alli Bennett, Rindi Hartman, and Karl Hoseth. The school was formerly named Woodrow Wilson from its founding in 1958 until July 2021 after a wave of name changes following the 2020 racial protests that swept the world.

Its attendance boundary includes Ruston.

HillTop artists
Dale Chihuly, a glass artist who graduated from the school, established HillTop Artists, a glass working program at Silas. For a $20 fee, students can blow glass, make glass beads, and participate in kiln work. This program is run by glass artists who trained with Chihuly at the Pilchuck Glass School.

Daffodil Festival
Every year, Silas participates in the Pierce County Daffodil Festival. A competition is held in house to select the Silas Princess. The Princess must have at least a 3.5 GPA and must be a senior. She will go on to compete against other regional schools for the Daffodil Festival Queen title. The Queen title is considered the highest honor of the regional festival. In April, the Silas band accompanies the Princesses on a float in the annual parade.

Name change

In 2020, two Tacoma Public Schools principals proposed renaming Woodrow Wilson High School and other schools in response to public outcry due to their association with controversial historic figures. Woodrow Wilson, the school's namesake, was a segregationist who had sympathized with the Ku Klux Klan and held pro-Confederacy views. A public survey circulated to 3,900 respondents in September 2020 was returned with 43 percent in favor of renaming the school and 57 percent in favor of retaining Wilson's name. On February 11, 2021, Tacoma Public Schools Board of Directors approved a plan to rename the school for Dr. Dolores Silas, the first Black woman to serve as a school administrator and city councilmember in Tacoma. The official renaming to Silas High School took effect on July 1 and is planned to take 18 months to fully transition, at a cost of $400,000 to replace signage and uniforms.

Sports
Silas participates in Cross Country, Girls' Soccer, Football, Girls' Swimming, Boys' Tennis, Girls Volleyball, Boys' Water Polo, Boys' Basketball Girls' Basketball, Boys' Swimming, Girls' Bowling, Wrestling, Project Unify, Boys' Baseball, Girls' Fast pitch, Boys' Soccer, Girls' Tennis, Golf, Girls' Water Polo, and Track. The Silas Boys Swimming and Diving team has won 29 State titles, with 24 consecutive titles between 1960–1983. The Boys Water Polo Team has won 4 state Titles. The Girls Bowling team have won 3 State Titles. The Boys Track And Field Team has won 6 State Titles. The Baseball team has won 1 State title in 1977. The Boys Golf Team has won 2 State titles.

Notable alumni
Ted Bundy, serial killer, graduated in 1965, executed in 1989
Dale Chihuly, noted glass artist
Xavier Cooper, defensive tackle for the Cleveland Browns
Joey Gjertsen, midfielder for the San Jose Earthquakes
Kaye Hall, 1968 Olympic gold and bronze medalist in women's swimming
Dick Hannula, former swimming coach, won 24 consecutive state swimming titles, 1960-1983
Leo Randolph, 1976 Olympic gold medalist in boxing
Darrell Robinson, holder of the 400-meter national high school track record (44.69 seconds) since July 24, 1982
Geoff Tate, lead singer of the Grammy-nominated band Queensrÿche
Desmond Trufant, cornerback for the Chicago Bears, first round selection in 2013 NFL Draft
Isaiah Trufant, former cornerback for the Cleveland Browns
Marcus Trufant, former cornerback for the Seattle Seahawks
Clyde Werner, former linebacker for the Kansas City Chiefs
John Zamberlin, former linebacker for the New England Patriots and Kansas City Chiefs; former head coach at Idaho State University

References

Further reading
Video:

External links

The Woodrow student newspaper
Daffodil Festival

High schools in Pierce County, Washington
Schools in Tacoma, Washington
Public high schools in Washington (state)
1958 establishments in Washington (state)